The  ("Contemplation on the Three Children's Hymn"), or shortly , is the only extant work of Bishop Gerard of Csanád (d. 1046). It is an important source of the history of the Christianization of Hungary in the early 11th century.

Manuscript
The entire work has been preserved in a late-11th-century manuscript written in Carolingian minuscule. A note at the top of one of its leaves indicates that it was held at the library of the Catholic Diocese of Freising in the 12th century.

Bishop Gerard

The work's author, Gerard, was the first bishop of Csanád in Hungary (now Cenad in Romania) from 1030 to 1046.

Subject

The work is a treatise on the story of Prophet Daniel's three friends whom King Nebuchadnezzar II sentenced to death for refusing to worship a golden statue. They were thrown into a fiery furnace, but they survived unharmed. In his work, Gerard contrasts "inane philosophy" with "heavenly wisdom".

References

Sources 

Medieval documents of Hungary
Shadrach, Meshach, and Abednego
History of Banat